New York State Route 787 (NY 787) is a state highway in Albany County, New York, in the United States. It is a superhighway extension of Interstate 787 (I-787), continuing northward from the underpass at exit 9 for NY 7 near Green Island to downtown Cohoes at NY 32. NY 787 is a four-lane divided highway named Cohoes Boulevard. With only select at-grade intersections, it may loosely be considered an expressway. For its entire length, NY 787 runs parallel to, and between, NY 32 and the Hudson River.

Route description
NY 787 begins at the partial cloverleaf interchange connecting NY 7 to I-787, the continuation of NY 787 south of the NY 7 arterial, near Green Island. Unlike I-787, which is a limited-access highway for its entire length, NY 787 is predominantly a divided highway as it lowers to grade level a small distance north of the I-787/NY 7 interchange. Near the Green Island-Cohoes city line, NY 787 intersects Tibbits Avenue, the first in a series of local streets connecting NY 787 to NY 32, which NY 787 parallels as it heads northward through Cohoes.

After intersections with Dyke Avenue and Bridge Avenue (the latter leading to lower Van Schaick Island) on the western bank of the Hudson River, NY 787 intersects NY 470, an east–west route linking Cohoes to northern Troy via upper Van Schaick Island. Past NY 470, NY 787 curves to the northwest and immediately intersects NY 32. Although NY 787 terminates here, New Courtland Street (later named North Mohawk Street and Cohoes Crescent Road) continues northwest from the intersection along the Mohawk River to U.S. Route 9 in Colonie, just south of the hamlet of Crescent, in Saratoga County.

Along NY 787, markers continue from those of I-787, without interruption. At the beginning of NY 787, some reference markers have the letter "I" along the top (route) row. The markers continue from those of I-787 and the control segments thereof.

History
The southernmost section of NY 787 was originally built in the early 1970s as part of I-787. At the time, the highway ended at a junction with Arch Street. It was extended north to Tibbits Avenue in the early 1980s and to NY 470 by 1990, at which time the portion of the I-787 freeway north of NY 7 was designated as NY 787. The short connector between NY 470 and NY 32 was completed by the following year.

Major intersections
Mileposts are a northern continuation of mileposts from I-787.

See also

References

External links

787
Limited-access roads in New York (state)
Transportation in Albany County, New York